"I Don't Wanna Cry No More" is a song and single made by German power metal band Helloween, taken from the album Chameleon. This song was dedicated to Roland Grapow's brother Rainer.

This single included a long blues instrumental jam called "Red Socks and the Smell of Trees".

Single track listing

Personnel
Michael Kiske - vocals
Roland Grapow - lead and rhythm guitars
Michael Weikath - lead and rhythm guitars
Markus Grosskopf - bass guitar
Ingo Schwichtenberg - drums

References

1993 singles
Helloween songs
EMI Records singles
German hard rock songs